Isohexylone is a recreational designer drug from the substituted cathinone family, with stimulant effects. It was first identified in the United Kingdom in June 2019.

See also
 Methylone
 5-Methylethylone
 Butylone
 Desmethylsibutramine
 Eutylone
 Pentylone
 Ephylone
 N-Ethylhexylone
 α-PHiP
 3F-PiHP
 UWA-101

References 

Cathinones
Designer drugs
Serotonin-norepinephrine-dopamine releasing agents